Brigitte "Gitti" Köck (born 18 May 1970 in Innsbruck) is an Austrian snowboarder and Olympic medalist. At the 1998 Winter Olympics in Nagano, Japan she won bronze in the Giant Slalom competition.

Results

World Championships:
1x 2nd rank (1997)
2x 3rd rank (1999, 2000)
3x 4th rank (1999, 2001, 2002)

European Championships:
1x 1st rank (1995)
3x 2nd rank (1995, 1998, 1999)
1x 3rd rank (1996)

Worldcup / World Pro Tour:
45 times top-3

External links
Website 

1970 births
Living people
Austrian female snowboarders
Olympic snowboarders of Austria
Snowboarders at the 1998 Winter Olympics
Olympic medalists in snowboarding
Medalists at the 1998 Winter Olympics
Olympic bronze medalists for Austria